Siman Island is a large island in the Ob River. It is located in Novosibirsk and Tomsk oblasts.

The island is about 45 km long and 15 km wide.

History
In the past, Lugovaya Village was located on the island, founded in the 1850s.

Population
Since 2013, one person lives on the island (disabled person).

References

Islands of Novosibirsk Oblast